Glenn Paul Zottola, (born April 28, 1947) is an American jazz trumpeter and saxophonist.

He is known for his work with Lionel Hampton, Benny Goodman, and Bob Wilber, and has accompanied a broad range of vocalists, including Mel Tormé, Frank Sinatra, Peggy Lee, Ella Fitzgerald, and Joe Williams. He has recorded over 50 albums and, in 1988, was a featured soloist at the 50th anniversary of Benny Goodman's Carnegie Hall Concert. In 1995, Zottola was bandleader on the Suzanne Somers daytime TV talk show at Universal Studios.

Discography

As leader
 Live at Eddie Condon's (Dreamstreet, 1981)
 Secret Love (Famous Door, 1982)
 Stardust (Famous Door, 1984)
 Christmas in Jazztime (Dreamstreet, 1986)
 Bechet Legacy: Birch Hall Concerts Live with Bob Wilber (Classic Jazz, 2013)
 Charlie Parker with Strings Revisited (Classic Jazz, 2015)

As sideman
With Butch Miles
 Butch Miles Salutes Chick Webb (Famous Door, 1980)
 Butch Miles Swings Some Standards (Famous Door, 1981)
 Butch Miles Salutes Gene Krupa (Famous Door, 1982)
 More Miles... More Standards (Famous Door, 1985)

With Bob Wilber
 Bob Wilber and the Bechet Legacy (Bodeswell, 1981)
 Ode to Bechet (Jazzology, 1982)
 On the Road (Bodeswell, 1992)

With others
 Mousey Alexander, The Mouse Roars! (Famous Door, 1979)
 Steve Allen, Steve Allen Plays Jazz Tonight (Concord Jazz, 1993)
 Phil Bodner et al, Highlights in Jazz (Stash, 1985)
 George Kelly, Plays the Music of Don Redman (Stash, 1984)
 Peggy Lee, Love Held Lightly (Angel, 1993)
 George Masso, A Swinging Case of Masso-Ism (Famous Door, 1981)
 George Masso, No Frills, Just Music (Famous Door, 1984)
 Maxine Sullivan, Together (Atlantic, 1987)

References

External links
Glenn Zottola web site

American jazz saxophonists
American male saxophonists
Swing trumpeters
Swing saxophonists
1947 births
Living people
People from Port Chester, New York
American jazz trumpeters
American male trumpeters
Jazz musicians from New York (state)
21st-century American saxophonists
21st-century trumpeters
21st-century American male musicians
American male jazz musicians